Ryosuke Miyaguni (宮國 椋丞, born April 17, 1992 in Itoman, Okinawa) is a Japanese professional baseball pitcher for Yokohama DeNA BayStars of the Nippon Professional Baseball (NPB).  He has played in NPB for the Yomiuri Giants.

Career

Yomiuri Giants
Yomiuri Giants selected Miyaguni with the second selection in the 2010 NPB draft.

On April 8, 2012, Miyaguni made his NPB debut.

On November 16, 2018, he was selected Yomiuri Giants roster at the 2018 MLB Japan All-Star Series exhibition game against MLB All-Stars.

On December 2, 2020, he become a free agent.

Yokohama DeNA BayStars
On March 15, 2021, Miyaguni signed with Yokohama DeNA BayStars of the NPB.

References

External links

NPB stats

1992 births
Living people
Baseball people from Okinawa Prefecture
Baseball people from Ishikawa Prefecture
Japanese baseball players
Nippon Professional Baseball pitchers
People from Kanazawa, Ishikawa
Yokohama DeNA BayStars players
Yomiuri Giants players